Jonathan  Coret (born ) is a Mauritian male weightlifter, competing in the 56 kg category and representing Mauritius at international competitions. He participated at the 2014 Commonwealth Games in the 56 kg event.

Major competitions

References

1989 births
Living people
Mauritian male weightlifters
Place of birth missing (living people)
Weightlifters at the 2014 Commonwealth Games
Commonwealth Games competitors for Mauritius